The Guam Department of Public Works is a government agency that manages public works in Guam.

It runs bus services in Guam.

References

External links 
 Official Guam Department of Public Works website
 Vincent P. Arriola at pacificislandtimes.com
 Joanne M. Salas Brown at mbjguam.com
 

Government of Guam